The Andean laniisoma (Laniisoma buckleyi), also known as the Andean mourner, is a species of passerine bird in the family Tityridae. It occurs in humid Andean forests in Venezuela, Colombia, Ecuador, Peru and Bolivia. The species was formerly considered conspecific with the Brazilian laniisoma (Laniisoma elegans).

There are three subspecies:
 Laniisoma buckleyi venezuelense Phelps & Gilliard, 1941 – northeast Colombia and northwest Venezuela
 Laniisoma buckleyi buckleyi (Sclater, PL & Salvin, 1880) – east Ecuador and east Peru
 Laniisoma buckleyi cadwaladeri Carriker, 1935 – northwest Bolivia

References

Andean laniisoma
Birds of the Northern Andes
Andean laniisoma
Andean laniisoma
Andean laniisoma